The  is a monorail system in the city of Kitakyushu in Fukuoka Prefecture, Japan, operated by , which is wholly owned by the Kitakyushu municipal government.

The  is the only line. It runs the 8.8 km (5.5 mi) between Kokura station and Kikugaoka station in Kokura Minami ward in about 18 minutes. It was opened on January 9, 1985, between the station now called Heiwadori and Kikugaoka, and at the time was the first monorail in the world with high level platforms and trains with floors entirely above the bogies. This increased available floor space and now all but one of Japan's surviving Alweg monorails have high level platforms and employ podium-free trains. This line was extended about 300 metres (1000 ft) to Kokura station from Heiwadori on April 1, 1998.

The monorail is owned by the city of Kitakyushu, and did not begin to make a profit until the extension to Kokura station was completed. This had been resisted by the businesses in Uomachi shopping district who feared they would lose customers, but that did not happen.

Once a year, there are beer parties and wine parties held on the monorail, bookings made in advance. Santa Claus boards the train on December 24.

Stations

See also 
Monorails in Japan
Kitakyushu Airport
List of rapid transit systems

References

External links 

Kitakyushu monorail (Official page in Japanese)
Map of the Kitakyushu Monorail

Monorails
Alweg people movers
Railway lines opened in 1985
Monorails in Japan
Japanese third-sector railway lines
Transport in Fukuoka Prefecture
Kitakyushu